Cornelius Logan may refer to:

Cornelius Ambrosius Logan, American playwright and actor
Cornelius Ambrose Logan, son of Cornelius Ambrosius, American physician and diplomat
Cornelius Logan, a fictional character in the Molly Moon novels